Weaveworld is a 1987 dark fantasy novel by English writer Clive Barker. It is about a magical world that is hidden inside a tapestry, known as the Fugue, to safeguard it from both inquisitive humans and hostile supernatural foes. Two normal people become embroiled in the fate of the Fugue, attempting to save it from those who seek to destroy it. The book was nominated in 1988 for the World Fantasy Award for Best Novel.

Plot summary
Decades prior to the book's opening, a magical race known as the Seerkind combined all of their powers to create a secret world known as "the Fugue", a carpet into which they wove their most beloved locations, animals, possessions and themselves as a safe haven. Their aim was to avoid persecution by humans (who call them demons and fairies) and eradication by a destructive being known as the Scourge. This creature's nature is entirely unknown to the Seerkind, as no-one has survived to describe it. The Fugue, resembling an ordinary, albeit exquisitely woven, carpet is left in the care of a normal woman, Mimi Laschenski, who married one of the Seerkind and resides in Liverpool, England.

Mimi reaches old age and is hospitalised following a stroke. A young man named Calhoun Mooney, chasing an escaped homing pigeon, accidentally glimpses the Fugue hidden in the carpet, which profoundly affects him. Simultaneously, Mimi's granddaughter Suzanna Parrish, arrives in the city at Mimi's behest. The mystery surrounding Mimi and the full potential of the carpet brings Cal and Suzanna together and quickly into confrontation with the primary antagonists: Immacolata, an exiled and extremely powerful Seerkind bent on revenge; Shadwell, a human salesman with limitless ambition; and Hobart, a conscientious policeman.

Cal and Suzanna acquire new allies and abilities in their goal of protecting the Fugue from destruction, venturing into it themselves twice. When Shadwell's actions result in the Fugue's seemingly total obliteration, the surviving Seerkind scatter. In a last desperate attempt to finish them, Shadwell locates and awakens the Scourge, which begins systematically destroying any and all traces of magic it can find.

Cal, Suzanna and their remaining allies make a final stand against Shadwell by using his own tactics against him and convince the Scourge to abandon its cause and leave the planet in peace. In the aftermath, a severely traumatised Cal is cared for by Suzanna whilst their friends adjust to permanent life amongst humanity. Eventually, Cal emerges from his withdrawal with the knowledge of how the Fugue is still alive and can be restored to its full glory.

Characters
 Calhoun "Cal" Mooney: A bored young man whose unremarkable life takes on a dramatic turn when he witnesses the Fugue. Immediately captivated, Cal attempts to simply observe the beauty of the Fugue once again but in doing so becomes embroiled in Immacolata and Shadwell's plot to destroy it. His salvation comes in the form of Suzanna as well as the Fugue's inhabitants who collectively encourage him to fight for it. Part of Cal's character development is a rite of passage less so of a boy to a man or even the reverse, but of a person self actualizing. His progression is charted through his recollections and imaginings of his grandfather; a poet dubbed "Mad Mooney". Through Cal's contact with the Seerkind he gradually inherits the identity of Mad Mooney himself.
 Suzanna Parish: A young woman who pays a visit to her dying grandmother, Mimi Laschenski and is given clues to her family's secret past. Suzanna carries both Seerkind and Cuckoo blood in her veins. After accidentally obtaining the "Menstruum" by an attack from Immacolata, she becomes almost as powerful and develops a complicated kinship with her as the story progresses. Suzanna is a sculptor/potter and a self-described pragmatist, initially hesitant to comprehend the bizarre situations she comes to find herself in she adapts quickly and learns to rely more on her instincts and less on her "cuckoo thinking". The object of Cal's affections from the onset, Suzanna politely rejects his advances believing their friendship is based more upon trust and the shared experience of the Fugue rather than romantic intimacy, instead she forms a relationship with Jerichau up until his demise, at the novel's conclusion it is hinted that she has developed feelings for Cal.
 Immacolata: A cold, ruthless sorceress, who was exiled by her own race for practising evil magic and desiring too much power. Already exceptionally gifted by the standards of the Seerkind, Immacolata is also a possessor/avatar of The Menstruum - a subtle, powerful and seemingly sentient form of magic that manifests only in women and differently with each individual - where Suzanna's is described as a heavenly silver light Immacolata's takes the form of her own weaponised blood. Introduced as the main villain of the first half of the book she has many aspects associated with the wicked witch trope such as avoiding sunlight and a predilection for surrounding herself with bones/body parts. Unlike her ally Shadwell, Immacolata acts out of revenge with no desire for personal gain. In achieving her goal she unwittingly brings about her own undoing when Shadwell betrays, humiliates and kills her. 
 Shadwell: A charismatic, middle-aged salesman. Little is revealed of his origins or even his full name: he is simply an ordinary-looking salesman and through years of experience has honed his trade to an art. Shadwell can persuade, charm and intimidate any prospective buyer through his own talent and through the use of a gift given by Immacolata; a jacket with enchanted lining in which viewers see whatever their heart most desires. At an unspecified time prior to the book's opening he was approached by Immacolata to be her ally in unmaking The Fugue, the existence of which he seemingly accepted with ease. He initially accepts her mission as an exciting challenge; the ultimate sale, with both knowing that the selling of something so powerful into any inexperienced hands would result in disaster for both buyer and goods, as is Immacolata's plan. 
 The Scourge: a catastrophic, ancient power of unknown origin that was present at the first emergence/evolution of the Seerkind. When they left their mutual garden home it reacted to their abandonment violently and slew them by the hundreds if not thousands. When its quarry vanished from sight into the rug, the Scourge returned to their ancestral garden to stand guard over the rest of time. In its lonely watch the Scourge slowly succumbed to madness forgetting itself, its duty and the Seerkind as well (although Immacolata given her great power could still sense its dormancy and inevitable re-awakening much to her terror). Secluded in time, when its garden (which is situated in a vast desert wasteland) is discovered by human explorers it learns from them the story of Genesis and after killing them takes its home for the garden of Eden and sees itself as an avenging angel: Uriel. Physically the Scourge (when not controlling a human host) is described as indefinite and full of paradoxes, genderless and at once dark and bleached, towering and infinitesimal and always surrounded by a smothering fog. Its only physical qualities, if any are innumerable eyes that rotate seemingly on wheels of fire throughout its shapeless form, indeed Barker attributes The Scourge to a being of geometries and fire rather than a corporeal entity.  
 The Hag: one of Immacolata's triplet sisters, whom she strangled while all three were in the womb. The Hag survived as the ghostly presence of a gruesome old woman, always accompanying her sisters and helping when necessary. She can divine knowledge by examining the afterbirth produced by her prolific and likewise ghostly sister. The Hag is permanently killed by her sister's progeny when Shadwell gains control of them.
 The Magdalene: Immacolata's other triplet sister who also survives after her prenatal death as ectoplasm. She frequently rapes defenceless men and gives birth to brutally deformed abominations (called by-blows) within hours of their conception. 
 Hobart: A British police inspector with unwavering dedication to the law, Hobart is contemptuous of civilians and criminals alike, believing everyone is guilty of something. Practical and narrow-minded to a fault, when first confronted with the after-effects of magic he deduces they are the result of unknown terrorist actions. When Suzanna and Jerichau accidentally incite a riot in down-town Liverpool he becomes convinced they are criminal masterminds and from there onwards become Suzanna's personal nemesis leading a nationwide manhunt for her. He is eventually sacked from the police, but continues his vendetta against Suzanna.
 The Rake: A hideous phantasm of a former sorcerer named Domville who tested Immacolata by becoming a necromancer in an attempt to seduce her, believing himself to be more powerful than her. The attempt failed when he brought forth 'the Surgeons' (although it is never confirmed, it is heavily implied that these were the Cenobites from Barker's earlier work The Hellbound Heart and its subsequent film adaptation Hellraiser), who proceeded to fillet him. He is resurrected by Immacolata as a terrifying boneless demon and sent to assassinate the Seerkind which he does, claiming the life of Lillia before being destroyed by a passing train after being lured onto the tracks by Cal and Nimrod.
 Jerichau St. Louis: one of the Seerkind who is among the first five to be unleashed from the rug. He later becomes Suzanna's friend and companion, choosing not to return to the weave.
 Nimrod: another one of the first five Seerkind to be unleashed from the carpet after Cal tears off a piece of it. He is a shape-shifter, initially trapped in the form of the infant which he used to escape from a jilted husband whose wife he had seduced.
 Mimi Laschenski: Suzanna's grandmother, the guardian of the rug. At the time Immacolata tracks her down, she is too old and weak to use an effective magical trick and willingly dies to prevent herself from disclosing any secrets, under Immacolata's pressure.
 Romo: A Seerkind lion tamer and husband of Mimi. During an encounter with Immacolata, his lions grievously wound her in revenge for Mimi's death at the hands of the dark sorceress.
 Balm de Bono: A Seerkind rope-dancer. He becomes friends with Cal during Calhoun's first visit to the Fugue, and later warns him and Suzanna of the approaching Scourge following a failed attempt to invoke the Old Science to combat it.
 Lemuel Lo: Owns an orchard of enchanted fruit (Giddy fruit) in the Fugue, which is later burned to the ground by Hobart's invading forces.

Critical reception
Reviewing Weaveworld in the Toronto Star, Henry Mietkiewicz stated "Barker proves to be far more accomplished and self-assured than in any of his previous work...Weaveworld depends upon a relatively intricate narrative structure and a host of finely crafted characters".

Dave Langford reviewed Weaveworld for White Dwarf #96, and stated that "'Dark fantasy' is today's posh word for 'horror'; Barker's considerable talents in this area lead to a few gobs of gratuitous nastiness and also some terrific creations".

Comic book adaptation

Weaveworld was made into a three-issue comic series in 1991 by Epic Comics. The series were written by Erik Saltzgaber and pencilled by Mike Manley. Clive Barker served as consultant.

Mini-series adaptation
Novelist and screenwriter Michael Marshall Smith completed a first draft of a script for an eight-hour mini-series in 1995. Smith was later asked to write a complete script, but the project has fallen into hiatus and he is no longer involved. In 2001, Barker stated in an interview that a Showtime six-hour mini-series was about to enter a two-year preproduction stage, directed by Queer as Folk director Russell Mulcahy, probably shot in Australia. Barker announced that shooting was slated to start in 2003, with Stephen Molton as the screenwriter.

In 2005, Barker stated that "finally, finally, finally!" the book had been adapted into a mini-series.

In 2006, Barker again claimed that the mini-series adaptation was about to enter production. In September 2015, CW network announced that Weaveworld will be adapted into a series to be written and produced by Warehouse 13’s Jack Kenny and produced by Clive Barker.

References

External links
 Weaveworld - 20th Anniversary  October 1987 - October 2007 Archived information and illustration from Revelations – The Official Clive Barker Resource.

1987 British novels
1987 fantasy novels
Novels by Clive Barker
British fantasy novels
William Collins, Sons books
Poseidon Press books
Novels set in Liverpool
Weird fiction novels